The House of Dies Drear  is a children's mystery novel by Virginia Hamilton, with sinister goings-on in a reputedly haunted house. It was published by Macmillan in 1968 with illustrations by Eros Keith. The novel received the 1969 Edgar Award for Best Juvenile Mystery. The House of Dies Drear is the first book in the Dies Drear Chronicles; the second is The Mystery of Drear House (1987).

Setting
The story is set in Ohio, in 1968.

Summary
Thomas Small is a 13-year old African American boy, who has moved with his family from North Carolina to Ohio. His father is a history professor who has leased the historic home of the abolitionist Dies Drear. The house has been mostly empty for years, and is riddled with hidden passageways that were used to hide escaping slaves on the Underground Railroad. An elderly caretaker, named Mr. Pluto, lives in a cave on the property, which he has converted into a home. There are rumors that the house is haunted by the ghosts of two escaped slaves who were captured and killed, and by the ghost of Dies Drear himself.

After the Darrows are driven off, Mr. Small helps Mr. Pluto catalog the artifacts in the cavern. They agree to keep the secret, at least until the cataloging is done and the collection is ready to show to the historical society. Thomas looks forward to starting school and making friends, possibly including young Mac Darrow.

Subjects
Library of Congress Subject Headings for The House of Dies Drear are: African Americans, Mystery and detective stories, Underground Railroad, and Ohio-History.

Television adaptation
The film was adapted into the 1984 television film The House of Dies Drear directed by Allan A. Goldstein.

See also

National Underground Railroad Freedom Center

References

External links

1968 American novels
1968 children's books
American children's novels
American mystery novels
Children's mystery novels
Edgar Award-winning works
Novels set in Ohio
Works about the Underground Railroad
Literature by African-American women
African-American novels